Steven P. Schook (born 1953) is a retired United States Army brigadier general and former United Nations diplomat.

Military career
Schook was born and raised in Mount Clemens, Michigan. He graduated from the United States Military Academy as a Regular Army Infantry officer. After several assignments as an operations and executive officer, he assumed command of the 2nd Battalion, 7th Cavalry Regiment, 1st Cavalry Division. Upon graduation from the United States Naval War College, he assumed command of the 3rd Brigade, 3rd Infantry Division (Mechanized).

From 1997 to 2002, Schook served on the Joint Staff and in the United States Army Forces Command. His general officer assignments include Chief of Staff, III Corps, and Assistant Division Commander, 1st Cavalry Division. He also served as director at the Human Resources Policy Directorate, Headquarters, Department of the Army.

From 2003 to 2004, Schook served as Chief of Staff, Kosovo Force (Main), Camp Bondsteel. In 2004, he assumed command of SFOR in Bosnia and Herzegovina. In 2004 and 2005, he was appointed to Commander and Senior Military Representative of NATO headquarters in Sarajevo, Bosnia and Herzegovina. After leaving the army as brigadier general in 2005 after 30 years of service, Schook worked as a senior vice president of New Technology Management Inc.

Diplomatic assignments
On April 19, 2006, United Nations Secretary General Kofi Annan appointed Schook the Principal Deputy Special Representative of the UN Secretary General (PDSRSG) in Kosovo. Schook succeeded Lawrence Rossin in that position and worked under SRSG Søren Jessen-Petersen and Joachim Rücker.

In 2007, Schook came under investigation by the United Nations Office of Internal Oversight Services (OIOS), in response to rumours and allegations including on aggressive behavior, and unprofessional and close relationships with Kosovan Energy Minister Ethem Çeku. According to German news magazine Der Spiegel, OIOS also investigated reports that Schook had disclosed the location of a man in a UN witness protection program, who had testified against Ramush Haradinaj. Schook's contract was not extended in December 2007. In January 2008, his predecessor Lawrence Rossin succeeded him as PDSRSG in Kosovo. In May 2008, Schook was cleared of all wrongdoing as OIOS concluded that there was no evidence of misconduct on his part. Schook now works in Kosovo as an advisor for Ramush Haradinaj.

References

1953 births
Living people
People from Mount Clemens, Michigan
United States Army generals
Recipients of the Legion of Merit
Recipients of the Defense Superior Service Medal
Recipients of the Badge of Honour of the Bundeswehr
Military personnel from Michigan